The 1965 Dunedin mayoral election was part of the New Zealand local elections held that same year. In 1965, elections were held for the Mayor of Dunedin plus other local government positions including twelve city councillors. The polling was conducted using the standard first-past-the-post electoral method.

Incumbent Stuart Sidey was defeated in his bid for a third term by Labour Party city councillor Russell Calvert. Calvert became only Dunedin's second Labour mayor after Edwin Thoms Cox. The Citizens' Association won seven seats on the city council to Labour's five.

Results
The following table shows the results for the election:

References 

Mayoral elections in Dunedin
Dunedin
Politics of Dunedin
1960s in Dunedin
October 1965 events in New Zealand